Matthew J. Slaughter (born 1969) is the Paul Danos Dean and the Earl C. Daum 1924 Professor of International Business at the Tuck School of Business at Dartmouth College. He is also the founding Faculty Director of Tuck's Center for Global Business and Government. In addition, he is currently a research associate at the National Bureau of Economic Research; an adjunct Senior Fellow at the Council on Foreign Relations; a member of the advisory committee of the Export-Import Bank of the United States, a member of the academic advisory board of the International Tax Policy Forum; and an academic advisor to the McKinsey Global Institute.

Slaughter is a well-published author, having written for several academic journals and co-authored the book Globalization and the Perceptions of American Workers.  He is also known for his presentations to non-specialist audiences, earning a reputation among business journalists as an advocate of globalization. Slaughter has also consulted for various corporations, addressing the challenges of international trade, investment, and taxation.

From 2005 to 2007 he was on leave from Dartmouth while he served on the Council of Economic Advisers. Slaughter joined the Faculty of Arts & Sciences at Dartmouth in 1994 and became a member of the Tuck School faculty in 2002. He is a recipient of the Tuck School's John M. Manley Huntington Teaching Award, and a member of Phi Beta Kappa. Slaughter received his bachelor's degree summa cum laude from University of Notre Dame in 1990, and his doctorate from the Massachusetts Institute of Technology in 1994 under the supervision of Paul Krugman.

References

External links
Matthew J. Slaughter's website at Tuck School of Business
White House Biography of Matthew J. Slaughter
Curriculum Vitae of Matthew J. Slaughter
Introducing Tuck's Next Dean

American economists
Dartmouth College faculty
Tuck School of Business faculty
University of Notre Dame alumni
Massachusetts Institute of Technology alumni
Year of birth missing (living people)
1960s births
Living people
Place of birth missing (living people)
Business school deans
United States Council of Economic Advisers